The Centre de services scolaire des Samares is a francophone school district headquartered in Saint-Félix-de-Valois, in the Canadian province of Quebec. It comprises several primary schools and high schools across municipalities in the Lanaudière  region. The commission is overseen by a board of elected school trustees.

Schools

Secondary schools
 École secondaire Barthélemy-Joliette (Joliette)
 École secondaire Bermon (Saint-Gabriel-de-Brandon)
 École secondaire de la Rive (Lavaltrie)
 École secondaire de l'Achigan (Saint-Roch-de-l'Achigan)
 École secondaire de l'Érablière (Saint-Félix-de-Valois)
 École secondaire de l'Espace-Jeunesse pavillon de l'Espace-Jeunesse (Saint-Charles-Borromée)
 École secondaire de l'Intervalle (Joliette)
 École secondaire de Sainte-Julienne pavillon du Havre-Jeunesse (Sainte-Julienne)
 École secondaire des Chutes (Rawdon)
 École secondaire des Montagnes (Saint-Michel-des-Saints)
 École secondaire Pierre-de-Lestage (Berthierville)
 École secondaire Thérèse-Martin (Joliette)

Primary schools
 Bérard (Saint-Zénon)
 Bernèche (Saint-Jean-de-Matha)
 de Grand-Pré (Saint-Jacques)
 de l'Espace-Jeunesse pavillon la Traversée (Saint-Charles-Borromée)
 de la Source (Lavaltrie)
 de la Source d'Autray (Lanoraie)
 de l'Ami-Soleil (Sainte-Émélie-de-l'Énergie)
 de l'Aubier (Saint-Lin-Laurentides)
 de l'Île Saint-Ignace (Saint-Ignace-de-Loyola)
 de Saint-Alphonse (Saint-Alphonse-Rodriguez)
 de Saint-Côme (Saint-Côme)
 de Sainte-Julienne (Sainte-Julienne)
 pavillon des Boutons-d'Or
 pavillon des Explorateurs
 pavillon Notre-Dame-de-Fatima 
 pavillon des Virevents
 de Sainte-Marcelline (Sainte-Marcelline-de-Kildare)
 de Sainte-Marie-Salomé (Sainte-Marie-Salomé)
 de Saint-Théodore-de-Chertsey (Chertsey)
 des Amis-Soleils (Lavaltrie)
 des Brise-Vent (Saint-Thomas)
 des Cascades (Rawdon)
 pavillon Sainte-Anne 
 pavillon Saint-Louis 
 des Eaux-Vives (Lavaltrie)
 des Grands-Vents (Saint-Gabriel)
 pavillon Reine-Marie I
 pavillon Reine-Marie II
 pavillon Sacré-Coeur
 des Mésanges (Joliette)
 pavillon du Christ-Roi
 pavillon Sainte-Marie
 des Moulins (Saint-Félix-de-Valois)
 pavillon Notre-Dame
 pavillon Sainte-Marguerite
 des Prairies (Notre-Dame-des-Prairies)
 pavillon Dominique-Savio
 pavillon Monseigneur-Jetté
 des Trois-Temps (Saint-Lin-Laurentides)
 pavillon de l'Arc-en-Ciel
 pavillon de l'Oiseau-Bleu
 pavillon Sir-Wilfrid-Laurier
 Dominique-Savio (Saint-Esprit)
 du Carrefour-des-Lacs (Saint-Lin-Laurentides)
 du Chemin-du-Roy (Berthierville)
 pavillon maternelle Sainte-Geneviève 
 pavillon Sainte-Geneviève 
 pavillon Saint-Joseph 
 Dusablé (Saint-Barthélemy)
 Emmélie-Caron (Sainte-Élisabeth)
 Germain-Caron (Saint-Didace)
 Intégrée de Saint-Pierre (Joliette)
 pavillon Marie-Charlotte
 pavillon maternelle Wilfrid-Gervais
 pavillon Saint-Pierre
 Jean-Chrysostôme-Chaussé (Lavaltrie)
 La Passerelle (Saint-Paul)
 pavillon Notre-Dame-du-Sacré-Coeur
 pavillon Vert-Demain
 Lorenzo-Gauthier — Rose-des-Vents (two municipalities)
 pavillon Lorenzo-Gauthier (in Saint-Charles-Borromée)
 pavillon Rose-des-Vents (in Joliette)
 Louis-Joseph-Martel — de la Gentiane (Saint-Calixte)
 pavillon de la Gentiane
 pavillon Louis-Joseph-Martel
 Monseigneur J.-A.-Papineau (Joliette)
 Notre-Dame (Saint-Roch-de-l'Achigan)
 Notre-Dame (Saint-Alexis)
 Notre-Dame-de-la-Merci — Saint-Émile (two municipalities)
 pavillon Notre-Dame-de-la-Merci (in Notre-Dame-de-la-Merci)
 pavillon Saint-Émile (in Entrelacs)
 Notre-Dame-de-la-Paix (Saint-Ambroise-de-Kildare)
 Panet (Sainte-Béatrix)
 Sacré-Coeur-de-Jésus (Crabtree)
 Saint-Coeur-de-Marie (Saint-Damien)
 Sainte-Anne (Saint-Cuthbert)
 Sainte-Anne (Saint-Norbert)
 Sainte-Bernadette (Notre-Dame-de-Lourdes)
 Sainte-Hélène (Sainte-Mélanie)
 Sainte-Thérèse (Joliette)
 Saint-Jean-Baptiste (Saint-Michel-des-Saints)
 Saint-Joseph (Saint-Liguori)
 Saint-Louis-de-France (Saint-Jacques)
 Youville (Mandeville)

See also

 Sir Wilfrid Laurier School Board - English school board which covers the same territory

References

External links
 Commission scolaire des Samares 

School districts in Quebec
Education in Lanaudière